John Basnett (birth registered first ¼ 1957) is an English rugby union, and professional rugby league footballer who played in the 1980s.

Background
John Basnett's birth was registered in Wallasey, Cheshire, England.

Playing career

International honours
John Basnett won caps for Great Britain (RL) while at Widnes in 1984 against France, and in 1986 in the 1985 - 1988 Rugby League World Cup against Australia.

Despite Basnett only playing in one game for Great Britain against Australia in 1986, Australian former captain Wally Lewis named him as one of the best English test wingers he had played against. Lewis praised Basnett's efforts in keeping his opposite number Dale Shearer quiet, although Great Britain ultimately lost the third Ashes test 24-15 played at the Central Park ground in Wigan.

Challenge Cup Final appearances
John Basnett played , i.e. number 5, in Widnes 14-14 draw with Hull F.C. in the 1982 Challenge Cup Final during the 1981–82 season at Wembley Stadium, London on Saturday 1 May 1982, in front of a crowd of 92,147, played  in the 9-18 defeat by Hull F.C. in the 1982 Challenge Cup Final replay during the 1981–82 season at Elland Road, Leeds on Wednesday 19 May 1982, in front of a crowd of 41,171, and played , i.e. number 5, in the 19-6 victory over Wigan in the 1984 Challenge Cup Final during the 1983–84 season at Wembley Stadium, London on Saturday 5 May 1984, in front of a crowd of 80,116.

County Cup Final appearances
John Basnett played , i.e. number 5, in Widnes' 8-12 defeat by Barrow in the 1983 Lancashire County Cup Final during the 1983–84 season at Central Park, Wigan on Saturday 1 October 1983.

John Player Special Trophy Final appearances
John Basnett played , i.e. number 5, (replaced by interchange/substitute Carl Gibson) in Leeds' 14-15 defeat by St. Helens in the 1987–88 John Player Special Trophy Final during the 1987–88 season at Central Park, Wigan on Saturday 9 January 1988.

Club career
John Basnett was the first Widnes player to score 5-tries in a match, scoring them in a John Player Trophy tie away to Batley, he later repeated this feat scoring all five tries in a 26-8 league win over Hull Kingston Rovers in 1986.

Outside of rugby
John Basnett currently lives in Cuddington, just outside Northwich, Cheshire, with his wife (Anne) and two children (William and Adam).

References

External links
!Great Britain Statistics at englandrl.co.uk (statistics currently missing due to not having appeared for both Great Britain, and England)
Statistics at rugby.widnes.tv

1957 births
Living people
English rugby league players
English rugby union players
Great Britain national rugby league team players
Lancashire rugby league team players
Leeds Rhinos players
New Brighton F.C. players
People from Wallasey
Rugby league players from Wirral
Rugby league wingers
Widnes Vikings players